Nury Ablikim Turkel (born 1970) is a Uyghur American attorney, public official and human rights advocate based in Washington, D.C. He is currently the Chair of the United States Commission on International Religious Freedom.

Turkel was born in Kashgar, Xinjiang Uyghur Autonomous Region. After his undergraduate graduation in 1995, he moved to the United States. He was president of the Uyghur American Association and is currently serving as the chairman of the board for the Uyghur Human Rights Project, a Washington, D.C.-based project for Uyghur human rights research and documentation. In 2020, Turkel was appointed a commissioner on the United States Commission on International Religious Freedom by Speaker of the House Nancy Pelosi. Turkel is the first U.S.-educated Uyghur lawyer and the first Uyghur American to be appointed to a political position in the United States. In 2020, he was included on Times list of the 100 most influential people in the world.

He is the author of No Escape: The True Story of China's Genocide of the Uyghurs

Early life
Turkel was born in a detention center in Kashgar (Kashi) during the Cultural Revolution. Turkel's grandfather had been associated with Uyghur nationalists and his mother was interned when she was six months pregnant. Turkel and his mother lived in the detention center for the first four months of his life. Turkel's father was a professor and his mother was a businesswoman. He completed his primary and middle school in his homeland. In 1991, he was admitted by Northwest A&F University in Shaanxi Province, China. In 1995, Turkel received his bachelor's degree and went to the United States for his higher education, never returning to China. He has a Master of Arts in International Relations and a Juris Doctor degree from American University.

Career

On March 10, 2003, Turkel made a statement to the Congressional-Executive Commission on China on the worsening human rights situation in East Turkestan (Xinjiang) in the wake of the September 11 attacks.

In 2003, Turkel co-founded the Uyghur Human Rights Project (UHRP) and has served as chairman of the board for the organization.

Between 2004 and 2006, Turkel served as president of the Uyghur American Association. He organised and lead the campaign to obtain the release of Rebiya Kadeer, in March 2005.

In May 2009, he defended a group of seventeen Uyghurs who were held in Guantánamo Bay since 2002. He wrote that Uyghurs have faced discrimination and are not a threat to U.S. communities.

In July 2009, after July 2009 Ürümqi riots, he condemned alleged Chinese oppression of Uyghurs in Ürümqi, he said that, "the Uyghurs literally lost anything that they had, even their native language and their own cultural heritage that they had been proudly adhering to. The economic pressure, social pressure, political pressure made the Uyghurs feel they had been suffocated by the communist regime.’’

In April 2012, Turkel praised Turkish President Recep Tayyip Erdoğan for showing support and sympathy for the Uighur people surrounding his trip to China in a way that was seen as rare among foreign leaders. However, in July 2020, Turkel 
criticized Turkey for deportation of Uyghur refugees to countries that then deport them to China.

In early 2017, Turkel had considered visiting his hometown of Kashgar, but was advised by the US government not to travel.

On August 10, 2018, the United Nations said that it has credible reports that China is holding a million Uighurs in secret camps. After that, on August 22, 2018, the BBC interviewed Turkel regarding the reeducation camps issue in Xinjiang. He told BBC it was true that one million or more Uighurs are being held in so called internment camps in his homeland and said that internees do not have access to legal rights or access to medical care. In September 2018, Turkel testified about the Xinjiang re-education camps before the United States House Foreign Affairs Subcommittee on Asia, the Pacific and Nonproliferation. Turkel successfully represented and provided legal assistance for Dolkun Isa, president of the World Uyghur Congress, restoring Isa's travel privileges to the United States and removing Isa's name from Interpol's Red Notice list.

In September 2019, Turkel testified to Congress that Uyghurs were being swept into a vast system of forced labor. Turkel said persons in the Xinjiang re-education camps are often moved to factories. Turkel wrote that Congress should ban the importation of cotton and textile products from Xinjiang until the end of internment and forced labor policies and the establishment of conditions for due diligence.

In May 2020, Nury Turkel was appointed a commissioner on the United States Commission on International Religious Freedom by Speaker of the House Nancy Pelosi who said of Turkel, "I am confident that he will continue to be a powerful voice for the Uyghur people and for the cause of justice around the world." Later that summer, Turkel thanked President Trump for signing the Uyghur Human Rights Policy Act and further wrote that, "It's a great day for America and the Uighur people".

Commissioner Turkel supported a July 2020 Commerce Department announcement sanctioning eleven Chinese companies involved in alleged human rights abuses in Xinjiang commenting that the decision, "will help ensure that the fruits of American innovation and industry are not inadvertently fueling outrageous religious freedom and labor violations." Turkel commented in July 2020 sanctions of the Xinjiang Production and Construction Corps (XPCC) saying that they were a significant step and that for years Uyghur human rights advocates had been calling for sanctioning the organization. Regarding sanctions of the XPCC, Commissioner Turkel commented that, “Now, no business can claim ignorance of China's oppression of the Uyghur people. We hope the sanctions signal to other Chinese officials that there are costs associated with taking part in the Communist Party's repression of religion. The world is watching and we know which officials and entities are responsible for the abuses against the Uyghur people.” In an August 2020 interview, Turkel described the camps as one of the worst global humanitarian crises and the largest incarceration of an ethnic minority since the Holocaust. In mid 2020, Turkel urged Congress to pass the Uyghur Forced Labor Prevention Act, which would direct the U.S. Customs and Border Protection to presume that any goods produced in the Uyghur region are the product of forced labor.

In September 2020, Turkel was named one of the Time 100 Most Influential People in the World.

Personal life
Nury Turkel is a Muslim. In 2007, he married Turkish American interior designer Nazli Bilkic. They have two children.

Turkel is proficient in several languages, including Uyghur (mother tongue), English, Turkish and Mandarin Chinese.

Bibliography

See also
World Uyghur Congress
Rebiya Kadeer
Dolkun Isa

References

External links
Nury Turkel on Twitter
Nury Turkel at the 2020 Geneva Summit for Human Rights (Geneva Summit for Human Rights, 2020)
Nury Turkel - Uyghur Human Rights Project, Washington (Interview with BBC, 2018)
Treatment of Uyghurs in China (C-SPAN; Turkel speaks beginning at 39:00, 2019)
Has China detained a million Uighur Muslims? (Al Jazeera; Nury Turkel and Victor Gao discuss Xinjiang re-education camps and related issues, 2018)
The New Gulag in China (Interview with Jay Nordlinger, 2018)
The UK joins the US to condemn the PRC for the Uyghur genocide & What is to be done? @NuryTurkel Uyghur Human Rights Project and a commissioner of the United States Commission on International Religious Freedom (Interview on The John Batchelor Show, 2020)
Arthur C. Helton Memorial Lecture: China's Uighurs (Council on Foreign Relations, 2019)
"The Tragedy of China's Uyghurs" (interview, 2020)

Living people
Uyghurs
Chinese emigrants to the United States
Naturalized citizens of the United States
1970 births
People from Kashgar
American Muslims